Egil Olsen (23 July 1948 – 27 June 2018) was a Norwegian footballer. He played in four matches for the Norway national football team from 1970 to 1971.

References

External links
 

1948 births
2018 deaths
Norwegian footballers
Norway international footballers
Place of birth missing
Association footballers not categorized by position